Arbutus Records is a Montreal based record label and management company founded by Sebastian Cowan in 2009. The label is named after the street by the same name in Vancouver, where Cowan grew up. The label have also begun expanding outside of Montreal, signing international artist Σtella, from Athens, Greece, on April 16, 2019, and Toronto-based trio Rapport on August 28, 2019.

History
Arbutus Records was created by a community of artists and musicians from the Montreal DIY music scene that came together in the 4600 square foot Mile End, warehouse loft space called Lab Synthèse. Lab Synthèse was co-founded by Sebastian Cowan in 2007. The record label was created in order to promote and cultivate the bands associated with the space. Police shut down Lab Synthèse and Cowan began managing the artists that performed there shortly after, resulting in the formation of Arbutus Records. Cowan and the label kickstarted the music careers of Blue Hawaii, Grimes, Majical Cloudz, Sean Nicholas Savage and TOPS among others early on. Arbutus records fosters a family environment that is not often seen in labels of its size, and as a result many of the artists under the label have remained in the label for over ten years. The label operates as  a DIY ethic community of multimedia artists and musicians, who work collaboratively to develop and release music which combines punk ethos and pop music.

Label values 

Arbutus Records was founded based on ideals that stemmed from the values of Constellation Records, focusing on curating individuality rather than a common sound. The label considers the release of records as a creative and collaborative process, moreover that the "art [made] is that of the artist", and they will always work in service of that. Ensuring that each artists vision and desires are communicated to the fullest extent possible is a priority at Arbutus Records. The label also puts emphasis on DIY culture in the music that they release and supporting their artists to accomplish more with very little.

Arbutus Records treats those they work with as family. They believe that everyone should be treated equally and have access to a quality music experience, whether in the form of appreciation or creation.

Artists
Blue Hawaii
Braids
Doldrums 
Graham Van Pelt 
Grimes
Lydia Ainsworth
Majical Cloudz
Michael Stasis
Moon King
Σtella
Sean Nicholas Savage
Tonstartssbandht
TOPS

Discography

References

External links
 Arbutus Records

Record labels established in 2009
Canadian independent record labels